Ideal Corners is an unincorporated community in Ideal Township, Crow Wing County, Minnesota, United States, near Pequot Lakes. It is along County Road 16 near County Road 39.

References

Unincorporated communities in Crow Wing County, Minnesota
Unincorporated communities in Minnesota